Morrow Massey (March 31, 1906 – December 16, 1966) was an American Negro league outfielder in the 1930s.

A native of Providence, Kentucky, Massey played for the Louisville Black Caps in 1930. In 17 recorded games, he posted 18 hits with two home runs in 63 plate appearances. Massey died in his hometown of Providence in 1966 at age 60.

References

External links
 and Seamheads

1906 births
1966 deaths
Louisville Black Caps players
People from Providence, Kentucky
Sportspeople from Kentucky
20th-century African-American sportspeople